Leo Gershoy (September 27, 1897 - March 12, 1975)  was a history professor at New York University from 1940 to 1975. In his name the American Historical Association awards an annual prize for the best new book on 17th- or 18th-century European history. An annual lecture at New York University is also named for him.

Gershoy received his B.A., M.A., and PhD from Cornell University. Before New York University, he also taught at Columbia University, Cornell University, his alma mater, University of California, Los Angeles, and the University of Chicago.

Works

Notes

1897 births
1975 deaths
Cornell University alumni
New York University faculty
Cornell University faculty
Columbia University faculty
University of California, Los Angeles faculty
University of Chicago faculty
20th-century  American historians
Historians from California